Chantilly Forever FC is a Canadian and American soccer club based in Hamilton, Ontario, Canada and Buffalo, New York, USA. The senior men's team competes in United Premier Soccer League.

History
Chantilly Forever is the only Ontario Soccer Association sanctioned soccer academy in Hamilton, Ontario. They received a National Canada Club License as a provincial level 1 holder through the Canada Soccer Association. In 2022, it was announced that they would join the US-based semi-pro United Premier Soccer League.

Current Squad 
Note: Flags indicate national team as defined under FIFA eligibility rules. Players may hold more than one non-FIFA nationality.

Updated:February 25, 2023

Current Staff Roster

Seasons

References

Association football clubs established in 2013
United Premier Soccer League teams
Soccer clubs in Ontario
Soccer clubs in Michigan